In baseball and softball, a double play (denoted as DP in baseball statistics) is the act of making two outs during the same continuous play. Double plays can occur any time there is at least one baserunner and fewer than two outs.

In Major League Baseball (MLB), the double play is defined in the Official Rules in the Definitions of Terms, and for the official scorer in Rule 9.11. During the 2016 Major League Baseball season, teams completed an average 145 double plays per 162 games played during the regular season.

Examples
The simplest scenario for a double play is a runner on first base with less than two outs. In that context, five example double plays are:
 The batter hits a ground ball
 to an infielder or the pitcher, who throws the ball to one of the middle infielders, who steps on second base to force out the runner coming from first (first out), and then throws the ball to the first baseman in time to force out the batter (second out). As both outs are made by force plays, this is referred to as a "force double play". This is the most common double play. The neighborhood play is a source of controversy, as umpires sometimes call the runner at second base out despite the infielder not clearly touching that base, but merely being "in the neighborhood".
 to the first baseman, who steps on first base to force out the batter (first out), and with the baserunner trying to advance from first base to second base, throws the ball to the shortstop who puts out the runner (second out). This is referred to as a "reverse force double play", although executing the first out removes the condition that forced the runner to take second base. The second out is not a force play and must be made with a tag.
 The batter hits the ball in the air
 a line drive to the first baseman, who catches it (first out), and then steps on first base before the baserunner can return to first to tag up (second out). This is also an example of an unassisted double play.
 a deep fly ball to the right fielder, who catches it (first out), meanwhile the baserunner tags up and attempts to advance, and the outfielder throws the ball to the shortstop who tags the runner before he reaches second base (second out).
 The batter strikes out (first out)
 Meanwhile, the runner attempts to steal second base, and the catcher throws the ball to a middle infielder, who tags the runner before he reaches the base (second out). This is colloquially known as a "strike 'em out, throw 'em out" double play.

Double plays can occur in many ways in addition to these examples, and can involve many combinations of fielders. A double play can include an out resulting from a rare event, such as interference or an appeal play.

Recordkeeping
Per standard baseball positions, the examples given above are recorded, respectively, as:
 4-6-3 (second baseman to shortstop to first baseman) or 6-4-3 (shortstop to second baseman to first baseman). Other combinations start with 1 (pitcher), 3 (first baseman), or (5 third baseman), followed by 6-3 or 4-3 depending on which middle infielder is covering second base on the play.
 3-6 (first baseman to shortstop) 
 3 (first baseman), unassisted
 9-6 (right fielder to shortstop)
 K (strike out), 2-6 CS (caught stealing, catcher to shortstop) or 2-4 CS (caught stealing, catcher to second baseman)

Double plays that are initiated by a batter hitting a ground ball are recorded in baseball statistics as GIDP (grounded into double play). This statistic has been tracked since 1933 in the National League and since 1939 in the American League. This statistic does not include line-outs into double plays, for which there is no official statistic for a batter.

Strategy 
The double play is a coup for the fielding team and debilitating to the batting team. The fielding team can select pitches to induce a double play — such as a sinker, which is more likely to be hit as a ground ball — and can position fielders to make a ground ball more likely to be turned into a double play. The batting team may take action — such as a hit and run play — to reduce the chance of grounding into a force double play.

Slang
In baseball slang, making a double play is referred to as "turning two" or a "twin killing" (a play on "twin billing", a moviehouse offering two features on the same ticket). Double plays are also known as "the pitcher's best friend" because they disrupt offense more than any other play, except for the rare triple play. A force double play made on a ground ball hit to the third baseman, who throws to the second baseman, who then throws to the first baseman, is referred to as an "around the horn" double play.

The ability to "make the pivot" on a force double play – receiving a throw from the third base side, then quickly turning and throwing to first base – is a key skill for a second baseman.

Tinker to Evers to Chance

The most famous double play trio—although they never set any records—were Joe Tinker, Johnny Evers and Frank Chance, who were the shortstop, second baseman and first baseman, respectively, for the Chicago Cubs between 1902 and 1912. Their double play against the New York Giants in a 1910 game inspired Giants fan Franklin Pierce Adams to write the short poem Baseball's Sad Lexicon, otherwise known as Tinker to Evers to Chance, which immortalized the trio. All three players were part of the Cubs team that won the National League pennant in 1906, 1907, 1908, and 1910, and the World Series in 1907 and 1908, turning 491 double plays on the way. They were elected to the National Baseball Hall of Fame in 1946.

Odd and notable double plays
 The New York Yankees recorded a rare 4-1-5 double play against the San Francisco Giants on July 24, 2016, in the top of the 8th inning. The Giants had Mac Williamson on first base with one out, when Ramiro Peña hit a ground ball that got by Yankees' first baseman Mark Teixeira but was fielded on the edge of the outfield grass by Starlin Castro. Castro threw to pitcher Chad Green at first base to retire Peña.  Meanwhile, Williamson had rounded second on his way to third, and a throw from Green to third baseman Chase Headley resulted in Williamson being tagged out, ending the inning.
 A bizarre 8-6-2 double play occurred in a nationally televised game between the New York Yankees and Chicago White Sox on August 2, 1985, in the bottom of the 7th inning. With Bobby Meacham on second base and Dale Berra on first base, Rickey Henderson hit a single to deep left-center field.  Berra ran quickly from first to second, while Meachem stopped his run towards third to return to second base to tag up (expecting the ball would be caught). After the ball was not caught, both runners – now within a few yards of each other – ran to third and then tried to score.  A throw from Luis Salazar in centerfield to Ozzie Guillén at shortstop was relayed to catcher Carlton Fisk in time for him to tag out both Meacham and Berra at the plate.
 A very similar 9-4-2 double play occurred on October 4, 2006, in Game 1 of the National League Division Series  between the Los Angeles Dodgers and the New York Mets. After Russell Martin hit a single to right field, both Jeff Kent and J.D. Drew were tagged out at the plate by catcher Paul Lo Duca.

 A 9-2-7-2 double play on July 9, 1985, effectively ended the career of Toronto Blue Jays catcher Buck Martinez. With Phil Bradley – a former University of Missouri football player – on second base, Gorman Thomas hit a single to right field. As Bradley rounded third, Blue Jays right fielder Jesse Barfield charged and fielded the ball and threw to Martinez, who had just enough time to catch the ball before being struck by a charging  Bradley. Despite suffering a broken leg and severely dislocated ankle, Martinez maintained control of the ball and registered the out at home plate. As Thomas rounded second, Martinez attempted to throw to third base from a seated position, but the ball missed the third baseman and went into left field. On the error, Thomas rounded third in an attempt to score.  Left fielder George Bell fielded the ball near the left-field foul line and quickly returned the ball with a one-hop throw to Martinez, who tagged out Thomas.
 On July 30, 2014, a 1-6-1-5 double play occurred without the ball being put into play in top of the 6th inning a game between the Pittsburgh Pirates and San Francisco Giants. Giants reliever Jean Machi, having inherited Gaby Sanchez (as a pinch-runner for Ike Davis) and Travis Snider as base-runners and having allowed a sacrifice to Jordy Mercer, issued a one-out walk to Chris Stewart with first base open. However, since the ball is still live on a walk, Machi, noticing that Snider was well off second base, threw the ball to shortstop Brandon Crawford, who chased down and tagged out Snider for the second out of the inning. Crawford then saw Sanchez having vacated third base and trying to score, and so Crawford threw the ball to Machi (by now in the third base line) to chase Sanchez back to third. Machi then threw the ball to Pablo Sandoval, who chased down and tagged out Sanchez for the third out.
 Another double play without the ball being put into play happened on June 25, 2019, between the Atlanta Braves and Chicago Cubs at Wrigley Field. In the bottom of the second inning, Braves starter Max Fried walked Javier Báez and Willson Contreras, then after striking out David Bote, walked Addison Russell to load the bases and bring up Cubs pitcher Adbert Alzolay to the plate with one out. Alzolay attempted to bunt on the first pitch he saw from Fried, but missed. Báez, already taking off for home, was then caught in a run-down by Braves catcher Brian McCann between third base and home plate, who then threw to third baseman Josh Donaldson, who then chased down Báez for the second out. Moving over to cover third, Braves shortstop Dansby Swanson then received a throw from Donaldson to tag out Contreras attempting to advance to third, ending the inning. The play was scored 2-5-6.
 Shifts away from normal defensive alignment can create scenarios in which unusual double plays can occur.
 During the April 12, 2008, game between the New York Yankees and the Boston Red Sox, in the top of the 7th inning the Boston infield was shifted right for New York left-handed power hitter Jason Giambi, with a baserunner on first. Giambi grounded to second baseman Dustin Pedroia, who threw to third baseman Kevin Youkilis, covering second due to the shift. Youkilis tagged second, then threw to first baseman Sean Casey to complete the rare 4-5-3 double play.
 The Chicago Cubs turned a 7-2-3 double play against the Pittsburgh Pirates on April 2, 2014.  Tied 3–3 in the bottom of the 13th inning, the Pirates loaded the bases with no outs.  The Cubs then defensively placed left fielder Junior Lake in the infield, near the third base line.  Batter Clint Barmes hit a ground ball to Lake, who threw home for one out, and the catcher then threw to first base for the second out.
A play can also last long enough to where an outfielder is able to reach the infield to record a double play. During the August 13, 2019 game between the Arizona Diamondbacks and the Colorado Rockies, in the top of the 8th inning, with one out and Nick Ahmed on third and Wilmer Flores at first, Diamondbacks outfielder Jarrod Dyson hit a sharp grounder to Rockies' first baseman Daniel Murphy. Ahmed broke on contact for home plate, and with the Rockies already down 9–2, Murphy, playing in to try to prevent another run from scoring, elected to bluff a throw home to keep Ahmed from being able to score. In the process, Murphy was able to run across the baseball diamond with the ball and tag Ahmed out before he could return to third base. Meanwhile, Flores had remained on second, but Dyson was heading toward second. Noticing this, Murphy then threw to second baseman Ryan McMahon, who chased back Dyson toward second, near where Flores remained. McMahon then threw back toward Murphy, causing Dyson to return to first. Murphy then threw over to first base, where Rockies pitcher Chad Bettis, now having reached first base, was positioned, to chase Dyson away from first. By this time, Garrett Hampson, a natural second baseman playing center field as a defensive substitute, had reached the infield, took the throw from Bettis, who then tagged out Dyson between first and second to end the half-inning. The play, lasting more than 20 seconds in total, was scored 3-4-3-1-8.
 The St. Louis Cardinals recorded a 3-2-5-4-2-8-6 double play against the Chicago Cubs on September 25, 2021. With the Cubs batting in the bottom of the 8th inning, down 5-4, David Bote led off the inning with a triple to left field off pitcher T.J. McFarland. Trayce Thompson walked on a 3-1 count, and Sergio Alcantara struck out swinging for the first out. With one out, on a 1-1 count, runners on first and third base, Rafael Ortega hit a ground ball to first baseman Paul Goldschmidt. Goldschmidt fielded the ball to catcher Yadier Molina, whom he and the third baseman Nolan Arenado forced Bote into a rundown between third and home. Molina fielded the ball to Arenado, who tagged Bote for the second out. Arenado fielded the ball to second baseman Tommy Edman, who threw it back to Molina, who was between second and third base. He fielded the ball to center fielder Harrison Bader, who was at second. Bader threw the ball to shortstop Paul DeJong, who tagged Thompson to complete the 3-2-5-4-2-8-6 double play.

All-time double play leaders by position

Source:

Single season
1B - Ferris Fain: 194 (Philadelphia Athletics, 1949)
2B - Bill Mazeroski: 161 (Pittsburgh Pirates, 1966)
SS - Rick Burleson: 147 (Boston Red Sox, 1980)
3B - Graig Nettles: 54 (Cleveland Indians 1971)
LF - Bibb Falk: 9 (Chicago White Sox, 1927) & Alfonso Soriano: 9 (Washington Nationals, 2006)
CF - Happy Felsch: 14 (Chicago White Sox, 1919)
RF - Mel Ott: 12 (New York Giants, 1929) & Chief Wilson: 12 (St. Louis Cardinals, 1914)
C - Steve O'Neill: 36 (Cleveland Indians, 1916)

Career
1B - Mickey Vernon: 2044 (20 seasons)
2B - Bill Mazeroski: 1706 (17 seasons)
SS - Omar Vizquel: 1734 (24 seasons)
3B - Brooks Robinson: 618 (23 seasons)
LF - Bobby Veach: 42 (14 seasons)
CF - Tris Speaker: 107 (22 seasons)
RF - Harry Hooper: 65 (17 seasons)
C - Ray Schalk: 222 (18 seasons)

All-time GIDP leaders

Single season
Jim Rice: 36 (Boston Red Sox, 1984)

Career
Albert Pujols: 426

Team
The team record for a single game is seven GIDPs. It was set by the San Francisco Giants, who grounded into seven double plays on May 4, 1969, in a 3–1 loss to the Houston Astros. The Pittsburgh Pirates suffered seven double plays (only six GIDPs) on August 17, 2018, in a 1–0 loss to the Chicago Cubs. The 1990 Boston Red Sox grounded into 174 double plays to set the single season team record.

See also
 Triple play
 Baseball statistics

References

Further reading

Fielding statistics
Baseball terminology
Baseball plays